Gritta Ley was a German film actress of the silent era.

Selected filmography
 The Marriage Nest (1927)
 Girls, Beware! (1928)
 The Criminal of the Century (1928)
 Autumn on the Rhine (1928)
 The Lady from Argentina (1928)
 Almenrausch and Edelweiss (1928)
 Under Suspicion (1928)
 The Daredevil Reporter (1929)
 The Lord of the Tax Office (1929)

References

Bibliography
 Goble, Alan. The Complete Index to Literary Sources in Film. Walter de Gruyter, 1999.

External links

1903 births
Year of death unknown
German film actresses
Actresses from Berlin